The first USS Tangier (SP-469) was a United States Navy patrol vessel in commission from 1917 to 1918.

Tangier was built as a private motor yacht of the same name by J. Woodtull at Orvington, Virginia. In 1917, the U.S. Navy acquired her from her owner, Mr. J. S. Parsons of Norfolk, Virginia, for use as a section patrol vessel during World War I. She was commissioned as USS Tangier (SP-469) on 24 April 1917.

Little is known of Tangiers operational history. She probably carried out patrol duties in the waters near Norfolk and in the lower reaches of the Chesapeake Bay.

Tangier was returned to her owner on 22 October 1918.

Notes

References

NavSource Online: Section Patrol Craft Photo Archive: Tangier (SP 469)

Patrol vessels of the United States Navy
World War I patrol vessels of the United States
Ships built in Virginia
Individual yachts